The New York City Fire Commissioner is the civilian administrator of the New York City Fire Department (FDNY), appointed by the Mayor of the City of New York. There have been 34 commissioners excluding Acting Fire Commissioners, and 38 commissioners including Acting Fire Commissioners. This is since Manhattan and the Bronx consolidated with Brooklyn, Queens, and Staten Island to form The City of New York in 1898. The current Fire Commissioner is Laura Kavanagh, who had held the office since February 16, 2022 as interim Fire Commissioner, but on October 27, 2022, she was appointed as Fire Commissioner.

Fire Commissioners of the pre-consolidated City of New York

Fire Commissioners of the consolidated City of New York

References

External links 

 Fire Commissioner City Of New York

Government of New York City